The Michael Wallace House on Broadus Branch Rd. in Garrard County, Kentucky, near Kirksville, was listed on the National Register of Historic Places in 1983.

It was built in the 1790s.  It is a one-and-a-half-story four-bay dry stone house of saltbox shape.

It was built by pioneer Michael Wallace.  Wallace also built and operated a grist mill on Paint Lick Creek below the house.

References

Houses on the National Register of Historic Places in Kentucky
Federal architecture in Kentucky
Houses completed in 1795
Houses in Garrard County, Kentucky
National Register of Historic Places in Garrard County, Kentucky
1795 establishments in Kentucky
Saltbox architecture in the United States